Stepan Mikhaylovich Kurianov (born 7 December 1996 in Kovrov) is a Russian cyclist, who currently rides for Russian amateur team Tyumen Region.

Major results

2013
 1st Stage 2 (TTT) Aubel–Thimister–La Gleize
 3rd Overall Tour du Valromey
1st Young rider classification
 6th Road race, UEC European Junior Road Championships
 7th Overall Trofeo Karlsberg
1st Young rider classification
 9th Trofeo Buffoni
2014
 Aubel–Thimister–La Gleize
1st Points classification
1st Stages 1 & 2b
 2nd Road race, National Junior Road Championships
 2nd Overall Ronde des Vallées
 4th Trofeo Buffoni
 10th Overall Trofeo Karlsberg
2016
 2nd Overall Samara Stage Race
1st Stage 1
 3rd Overall 
1st Stages 2 & 3
 3rd Trofeo Gianfranco Bianchin
 9th Overall Carpathian Couriers Race
2017
 1st Overall Samara Stage Race
1st Stages 2 & 4
 3rd Time trial, National Under-23 Road Championships
 5th Grand Prix Minsk
 7th ZLM Tour
 9th Minsk Cup
 10th Overall Five Rings of Moscow
2021
 7th Overall Five Rings of Moscow

References

External links

1996 births
Living people
Russian male cyclists
European Games competitors for Russia
Cyclists at the 2019 European Games
People from Kovrov
Sportspeople from Vladimir Oblast
21st-century Russian people